Lettice Pierce Bryan (1805–1877) was an American author, who wrote The Kentucky Housewife, a cookbook originally published in 1839.

Life 

Lettice Pierce was born in central Kentucky, probably near Danville, to James A. Pierce and Elizabeth Crow Pierce, one of three children. In 1823, she married Virginia-born Edmond Bryan. When Bryan was writing her cookbook, she lived in Monticello, Kentucky; her husband was studying at the Medical College of Ohio and the couple had nine young children. After the cookbook was published, the family moved twice - to Washington County and then to Grayson County, Kentucky. Bryan had 14 children.

Bryan died at age 72, in 1877, in Macoupin County, Illinois, at the home of her son-in-law C. F. Burnett. She is buried at Cave Hill Cemetery in Louisville, Kentucky. Her husband pre-deceased her, dying in 1863.

References

External links 
Full text of The Kentucky Housewife at Library of Congress, 1841 edition
Full text of The Kentucky Housewife at Hathi Trust Digital Library, 1839 edition
 

1805 births
1877 deaths
19th-century American women writers
Burials at Cave Hill Cemetery
Kentucky women writers
American cookbook writers
Women cookbook writers